Antonio Denzio (23 September 1689 – after 1763) was an Italian impresario, tenor, and librettist. Born in Venice to a family of musicians and operatic personnel, he pursued a career mainly as a singer until 1724, when he traveled to Bohemia as a member of the opera company of Antonio Maria Peruzzi, probably his uncle. Peruzzi had the idea of bringing an Italian opera company to Central Europe to perform first in Prague, then Dresden and Leipzig. The company was first brought to Bohemia under the patronage of Count Franz Anton von Sporck, who had it play at his palace at Kuks in northwest Bohemia in the summer of 1724. The performances were so successful that he permitted the company to perform free of charge in his palace in Prague. After disagreements with Peruzzi, Denzio was able to supplant him as impresario before the end of the year 1724 and continued productions in the Sporck palace until 1735. Peruzzi left with some of the Peruzzi-Denzio players to found the Breslau Opera. Denzio's opera theater at Sporck's palace was the first standing opera theater in the city. His productions were popular with the Bohemian nobility until about 1729, after which Denzio's finances deteriorated. Count Sporck provided no financial assistance to the company except the free use of his theater, and he allowed it to fail. The company went bankrupt and Denzio was forced to spend time in debtors' prison. During its heyday, Denzio was able to attract at least one of the principal singing stars in Italy to Prague each season. The most prominent of all was Margherita Gualandi, who was forced to come to Prague after being blackballed in Italy for bad behavior. Denzio sought the assistance of Antonio Vivaldi in engaging singers for his company, and the composer sent music. In the early 1730s, Vivaldi came himself to Prague. Some of the music for one of his operas composed for Prague, Argippo, has only recently been re-discovered.

Isolated as he was from his operatic base of Venice, Denzio was forced to become a theatrical jack-of-all-trades. He sang himself in the company's productions and also served as its poet. He wrote several full-length librettos, the most significant of which was La pravità castigata (1730), the earliest opera based on the Don Juan tale to use the original setting and characters.

After returning briefly to Venice in 1735, Denzio tried again to mount opera companies in Northern Europe, including in Brussels and Augsburg. Unfortunately, all of these ventures failed. The last record of him comes from a newspaper announcement published in Moscow in 1763.

References

Bibliography
Freeman, Daniel E. The Opera Theater of Count Franz Anton von Sporck in Prague. Stuyvesant, New York:  Pendragon Press, 1992.
Jonášová, Milada.  "I Denzio: tre generazioni di musicisti a Venezia e a Praga. Hudební věda 45 (2008): 57-114.

Impresarios
Italian male singers
Italian operatic tenors
Italian poets
Italian male poets
Italian opera librettists
Opera managers
Musicians from Venice
1689 births
18th-century deaths
Italian male dramatists and playwrights